Świątniki Małe is a village in the administrative district of Gmina Mieleszyn, within Gniezno County, Greater Poland Voivodeship, in west-central Poland. It lies approximately six kilometers (4 mi) southeast of Mieleszyn, twelve kilometers (7 mi) north of Gniezno, and fifty-one kilometers (32 mi) northeast of the regional capital of Poznań.

References

Villages in Gniezno County